Ladakh is a region administered by India as a union territory which constitutes a part of the larger Kashmir region and has been the subject of dispute between India, Pakistan, and China since 1947. Ladakh is bordered by the Tibet Autonomous Region to the east, the Indian state of Himachal Pradesh to the south, both the Indian-administered union territory of Jammu and Kashmir and the Pakistan-administered Gilgit-Baltistan to the west, and the southwest corner of Xinjiang across the Karakoram Pass in the far north. It extends from the Siachen Glacier in the Karakoram range to the north to the main Great Himalayas to the south. The eastern end, consisting of the uninhabited Aksai Chin plains, is claimed by the Indian Government as part of Ladakh, and has been under Chinese control since 1962.

In the past, Ladakh gained importance from its strategic location at the crossroads of important trade routes, but as Chinese authorities closed the borders between Tibet Autonomous Region and Ladakh in the 1960s, international trade dwindled. Since 1974, the Government of India has successfully encouraged tourism in Ladakh. As Ladakh is strategically important, the Indian military maintains a strong presence in the region.

The largest town in Ladakh is Leh, followed by Kargil, each of which headquarters a district. The Leh district contains the Indus, Shyok and Nubra river valleys. The Kargil district contains the Suru, Dras and Zanskar river valleys. The main populated regions are the river valleys, but the mountain slopes also support pastoral Changpa nomads. The main religious groups in the region are Muslims (mainly Shia) (46%), Buddhists (mainly Tibetan Buddhists) (40%), and Hindus (12%) with the remaining 2% made of other religions. Ladakh is one of the most sparsely populated regions in India. Its culture and history are closely related to those of Tibet.

Ladakh was established as a union territory of India on 31 October, 2019, following the passage of the Jammu and Kashmir Reorganisation Act. Prior to that, it was part of the Jammu and Kashmir state. Ladakh is both the largest and the second least populous union territory of India.

Names 
The classical name in   means the "land of high passes". Ladak is its pronunciation in several Tibetan dialects.

The region was previously known as Maryul.

Medieval Islamic scholars called Ladakh the Great Tibet (derived from Turko-Arabic Ti-bat, meaning "highland"); Baltistan and other trans-Himalayan states in Kashmir's vicinity were referred to as "Little Tibets".

It has also been called Ma-Lo-Pho (by Hiuen Tsang) or Lal Bhumi. Names in the local language include Kanchapa (Land of snow) and Ripul (Country of mountains).

History

Ancient history 

Rock carvings found in many parts of Ladakh indicate that the area has been inhabited from Neolithic times. Ladakh's earliest inhabitants consisted of nomads known as Kampa. Later settlements were established by Mons from Kullu and Brokpas who originated from Gilgit. Around the 1st century, Ladakh was a part of the Kushan Empire. Buddhism spread into western Ladakh from Kashmir in the 2nd century. The 7th-century Buddhist traveller Xuanzang describes the region in his accounts. Xuanzang's term of Ladakh is Mo-lo-so, which has been reconstructed by academics as *Malasa, *Marāsa, or *Mrāsa, which is believed to have been the original name of the region.

For much of the first millennium, western Tibet comprised Zhangzhung kingdom(s), which practised the Bon religion. Sandwiched between Kashmir and Zhangzhung, Ladakh is believed to have been alternatively under the control of one or other of these powers. Academics find strong influences of Zhangzhung language and culture in "upper Ladakh" (from the middle section of the Indus valley to the southeast). The penultimate king of Zhangzhung is said to have been from Ladakh.

From around 660 CE, Central Tibet and China started contesting the "four garrisons" of the Tarim Basin (present day Xinjiang), a struggle that lasted three centuries. India's Karkota Empire and the Umayyad Caliphate too joined the contest for Xinjiang soon afterwards. Baltistan and Ladakh were at the centre of these struggles. Academics infer from the slant of Ladakhi chronicles that Ladakh may have owed its primary allegiance to Tibet during this time, but that it was more political than cultural. Ladakh remained Buddhist and its culture was not yet Tibetan.

Early medieval history 

In the 9th century, Tibet's ruler Langdarma was assassinated and Tibet fragmented. Kyide Nyimagon, Langdarma's great-grandson, fled to West Tibet , and founded a new West Tibetan kingdom at the heart of the old Zhangzhung, now called Ngari in the Tibetan language.

Nyimagon's eldest son, Lhachen Palgyigon, is believed to have conquered the regions to the north, including Ladakh and Rutog. After the death of Nyimagon, his kingdom was divided among his three sons, Palgyigon receiving Ladakh, Rutog, Thok Jalung and an area referred to as Demchok Karpo (a holy mountain near the present-day Demchok village). The second son received Guge–Purang (called "Ngari Korsum") and the third son received Zanskar and Spiti (to the southwest of Ladakh). This three-way division of Nyimagon's empire was recognised as historic and remembered in the chronicles of all the three regions as a founding narrative.
He gave to each of his sons a separate kingdom, viz., to the eldest Dpal-gyi-gon, Maryul of Mngah-ris, the inhabitants using black bows; ru-thogs [Rutog] of the east and the Gold-mine of Hgog [possibly Thok Jalung]; nearer this way Lde-mchog-dkar-po [Demchok Karpo]; ...

The first West Tibetan dynasty of Maryul founded by Palgyigon lasted five centuries, being weakened towards its end by the conquests of the Mongol/Mughal noble Mirza Haidar Dughlat. Throughout this period the region was called "Maryul", possibly from the original proper name *Mrasa (Xuangzhang's, Mo-lo-so), but in the Tibetan language it was interpreted to mean "lowland" (the lowland of Ngari). Maryul remained staunchly Buddhist during this period, having participated in the second diffusion of Buddhism from India to Tibet via Kashmir and Zanskar.

Medieval history 

Between the 1380s and early 1510s, many Islamic missionaries propagated Islam and proselytised the Ladakhi people. Sayyid Ali Hamadani, Sayyid Muhammad Nur Baksh and Mir Shamsuddin Iraqi were three important Sufi missionaries who propagated Islam to the locals. Mir Sayyid Ali was the first one to make Muslim converts in Ladakh and is often described as the founder of Islam in Ladakh. Several mosques were built in Ladakh during this period, including in Mulbhe, Padum and Shey, the capital of Ladakh. His principal disciple, Sayyid Muhammad Nur Baksh also propagated Islam to Ladakhis and the Balti people rapidly converted to Islam. Noorbakshia Islam is named after him and his followers are only found in Baltistan and Ladakh. During his youth, Sultan Zain-ul-Abidin expelled the mystic Sheikh Zain Shahwalli for showing disrespect to him. The sheikh then went to Ladakh and proselytised many people to Islam. In 1505, Shamsuddin Iraqi, a noted Shia scholar, visited Kashmir and Baltistan. He helped in spreading Shia Islam in Kashmir and converted the overwhelming majority of Muslims in Baltistan to his school of thought.

It is unclear what happened to Islam after this period and it seems to have received a setback. Mirza Muhammad Haidar Dughlat who invaded and briefly conquered Ladakh in 1532, 1545 and 1548, does not record any presence of Islam in Leh during his invasion although Shia Islam and Noorbakshia Islam continued to flourish in other regions of Ladakh.

King Bhagan reunited and strengthened Ladakh and founded the Namgyal dynasty (Namgyal means "victorious" in several Tibetan languages). The Namgyals repelled most Central Asian raiders and temporarily extended the kingdom as far as Nepal. During the Balti invasion led by Raja Ali Sher Khan Anchan, many Buddhist temples and artefacts were damaged. Ali Sher Khan took the king and his soldiers as captives. Jamyang Namgyal was later restored to the throne by Ali Sher Khan and given the hand of a Muslim princess in marriage. Her name was Gyal Khatun or Argyal Khatoom. She was to be the first queen and her son was to become the next ruler. Historical accounts differ upon who her father was. Some identify Ali's ally and Raja of Khaplu Yabgo Shey Gilazi as her father, while others identify Ali himself as the father. In the early 17th century efforts were made to restore the destroyed artefacts and gonpas by Sengge Namgyal, the son of Jamyang and Gyal. He expanded the kingdom into Zangskar and Spiti. Despite a defeat of Ladakh by the Mughals, who had already annexed Kashmir and Baltistan, Ladakh retained its independence.

Islam begins to take root in the Leh area in the beginning of the 17th century after the Balti invasion and the marriage of Gyal to Jamyang. A large group of Muslim servants and musicians were sent along with Gyal to Ladakh and private mosques were built where they could pray. The Muslim musicians later settled in Leh. Several hundred Baltis migrated to the kingdom and according to oral tradition many Muslim traders were granted land to settle. Many other Muslims were invited over the following years for various purposes.

In the late 17th century, Ladakh sided with Bhutan in its dispute with Tibet which, among other reasons, resulted in its invasion by the Tibetan Central Government. This event is known as the Tibet–Ladakh–Mughal war of 1679–1684. Kashmiri historians assert that the king converted to Islam in return for the assistance by Mughal Empire after this, however, Ladakhi chronicles do not mention such a thing. The king agreed to pay tribute to the Mughals in return for defending the kingdom. The Mughals, however, withdrew after being paid off by the 5th Dalai Lama. With the help of reinforcements from Galdan Boshugtu Khan, Khan of the Zungar Empire, the Tibetans attacked again in 1684. The Tibetans were victorious and concluded a treaty with Ladakh then they retreated back to Lhasa in December 1684. The Treaty of Tingmosgang in 1684 settled the dispute between Tibet and Ladakh but severely restricted Ladakh's independence.

Princely state of Jammu and Kashmir 

In 1834, the Sikh Zorawar Singh, a general of Raja Gulab Singh of Jammu, invaded and annexed Ladakh to Jammu under the suzerainty of the Sikh Empire. After the defeat of the Sikhs in the First Anglo-Sikh War, the state of Jammu and Kashmir was established as a separate princely state under British suzerainty. The Namgyal family was given the jagir of Stok, which it nominally retains to this day. European influence began in Ladakh in the 1850s and increased. Geologists, sportsmen, and tourists began exploring Ladakh. In 1885, Leh became the headquarters of a mission of the Moravian Church.

Ladakh was administered as a wazarat under Dogra rule, with a governor termed wazir-e-wazarat. It had three tehsils, based at Leh, Skardu and Kargil. The headquarters of the wazarat was at Leh for six months of the year and at Skardu for six months. When the legislative assembly, called Praja Sabha, was established in 1934, Ladakh was given two nominated seats in the assembly.

Ladakh was claimed as part of Tibet by Phuntsok Wangyal, a Tibetan Communist leader.

Indian state of Jammu and Kashmir 

At the time of the partition of India in 1947, the Dogra ruler Maharaja Hari Singh signed the Instrument of Accession to India. Pakistani raiders from Gilgit had reached Ladakh and military operations were initiated to evict them. The wartime conversion of the pony trail from Sonamarg to Zoji La by army engineers permitted tanks to move up and successfully capture the pass. The advance continued. Dras, Kargil and Leh were liberated and Ladakh cleared of the infiltrators.

In 1949, China closed the border between Nubra and Xinjiang, blocking old trade routes. In 1955 China began to build roads connecting Xinjiang and Tibet through the Aksai Chin area. The Indian effort to retain control of Aksai Chin led to the Sino-Indian War of 1962, which India lost. China also built the Karakoram highway jointly with Pakistan. India built the Srinagar-Leh Highway during this period, cutting the journey time between Srinagar and Leh from 16 days to two. The route, however, remains closed during the winter months due to heavy snowfall. Construction of a  tunnel across Zoji La pass is under consideration to make the route functional throughout the year.

The Kargil War of 1999, codenamed "Operation Vijay" by the Indian Army, saw infiltration by Pakistani troops into parts of Western Ladakh, namely Kargil, Dras, Mushkoh, Batalik and Chorbatla, overlooking key locations on the Srinagar-Leh highway. Extensive operations were launched in high altitudes by the Indian Army with considerable artillery and air force support. Pakistani troops were evicted from the Indian side of the Line of Control which the Indian government ordered was to be respected and which was not crossed by Indian troops. The Indian government was criticised by the Indian public because India respected geographical co-ordinates more than India's opponents: Pakistan and China.

The Ladakh region was divided into the Kargil and Leh districts in 1979. In 1989, there were violent riots between Buddhists and Muslims. Following demands for autonomy from the Kashmiri-dominated state government, the Ladakh Autonomous Hill Development Council was created in the 1990s. Leh and Kargil districts now each have their own locally elected Hill Councils with some control over local policy and development funds. In 1991, a Peace Pagoda was erected in Leh by Nipponzan Myohoji.

There was a heavy presence of Indian Army and Indo-Tibetan Border Police forces in Ladakh. These forces and People's Liberation Army forces from China have, since the 1962 Sino-Indian War, had frequent stand-offs along the Ladakh portion of the Line of Actual Control. Out of the  border in Ladakh, only  is the International Border, and the remaining  is the Line of Actual Control. The stand-off involving the most troops was in September 2014 in the disputed Chumar region when 800 to 1,000 Indian troops and 1,500 Chinese troops came into close proximity to each other.

Ladakh Division 
On 8 February 2019, Ladakh became a separate Revenue and Administrative Division within Jammu and Kashmir, having previously been part of the Kashmir Division. As a division, Ladakh was granted its own Divisional Commissioner and Inspector General of Police.

Leh was initially chosen to be the headquarters of the new division however, following protests, it was announced that Leh and Kargil will jointly serve as the divisional headquarters, each hosting an Additional Divisional Commissioner to assist the Divisional Commissioner and Inspector General of Police who will spend half their time in each town.

Union territory of Ladakh 

The people of Ladakh had been demanding Ladakh to be constituted as a separate territory since 1930s,  because of perceived unfair treatment by Kashmir and Ladakh's cultural differences with predominantly Muslim Kashmir valley, while some people in Kargil opposed union territory status for Ladakh. The first organized agitation was launched against Kashmir's "dominance" in the year 1964. In late 1980s, a much larger mass agitation was launched to press their demand for union territory status.

In August 2019, a reorganisation act was passed by the Parliament of India which contained provisions to reconstitute Ladakh as a union territory, separate from the rest of Jammu and Kashmir on 31 October 2019. Under the terms of the act, the union territory is administered by a Lieutenant Governor acting on behalf of the Central Government of India and does not have an elected legislative assembly or chief minister. Each district within the union territory continues to elect an autonomous district council as done previously.

The demand for Ladakh as separate union territory was first raised by the parliamentarian Kushok Bakula Rinpoche around 1955, which was later carried forward by another parliamentarian Thupstan Chhewang. The former Jammu and Kashmir state use to obtain large allocation of annual funds from the union government based on the fact that the large geographical area of the Ladakh (comprising 65% of total area), but Ladakh was allocated only 2% of the state budget based on its relative population. Within the first year of the formation of Ladakh as separate union territory, its annual budget allocation has increased 4 times from 57 crore to 232 crore.

Geography 

It extends from the Himalayan to the Kunlun Ranges and includes the upper Indus River valley.

Historically, the region included the Baltistan (Baltiyul) valleys (now mostly in Pakistani administered part of Kashmir), the entire upper Indus Valley, the remote Zanskar, Lahaul and Spiti to the south, much of Ngari including the Rudok region and Guge in the east, Aksai Chin in the northeast, and the Nubra Valley to the north over Khardong La in the Ladakh Range. Contemporary Ladakh borders Tibet to the east, the Lahaul and Spiti regions to the south, the Vale of Kashmir, Jammu and Baltiyul regions to the west, and the southwest corner of Xinjiang across the Karakoram Pass in the far north. The historic but imprecise divide between Ladakh and the Tibetan Plateau commences in the north in the intricate maze of ridges east of Rudok including Aling Kangri and Mavang Kangri, and continues southeastward toward northwestern Nepal. Before partition, Baltistan, now under Pakistani control, was a district in Ladakh. Skardu was the winter capital of Ladakh while Leh was the summer capital.

The mountain ranges in this region were formed over 45 million years by the folding of the Indian Plate into the more stationary Eurasian Plate. The drift continues, causing frequent earthquakes in the Himalayan region. The peaks in the Ladakh Range are at a medium altitude close to the Zoji-la and increase toward southeast, culminating in the twin summits of Nun-Kun.

The Suru and Zanskar valleys form a great trough enclosed by the Himalayas and the Zanskar Range. Kargil, the only town in the Suru valley, is the second most important town in Ladakh. It was an important staging post on the routes of the trade caravans before 1947, being more or less equidistant, at about 230 kilometres from Srinagar, Leh, Skardu and Padum. The Zangskar valley lies in the troughs of the Stod and the Lungnak rivers. The region experiences heavy snowfall; the Pensi-la is open only between June and mid-October. Dras and the Mushkoh Valley form the western extremity of Ladakh.

The Indus River is the backbone of Ladakh. Most major historical and current towns – Shey, Leh, Basgo and Tingmosgang (but not Kargil), are close to the Indus River. After the Indo-Pakistani War of 1947, the stretch of the Indus flowing through Ladakh became the only part of this river, which is greatly venerated in the Hindu religion and culture, that still flows through India.

The Siachen Glacier is in the eastern Karakoram Range in the Himalaya Mountains along the disputed India-Pakistan border. The Karakoram Range forms a great watershed that separates China from the Indian subcontinent and is sometimes called the "Third Pole." The glacier lies between the Saltoro Ridge immediately to the west and the main Karakoram Range to the east.

The region comprising the valley of the Shayok and Nubra rivers is known as Nubra. The Karakoram Range in Ladakh is not as mighty as in Baltistan. The massifs to the north and east of the Nubra–Siachen line include the Apsarasas Group (highest point at ) the Rimo Muztagh (highest point at ) and the Teram Kangri Group (highest point at ) together with Mamostong Kangri and Singhi Kangri. North of the Karakoram lies the Kunlun. Thus, between Leh and eastern Central Asia there is a triple barrier – the Ladakh Range, Karakoram Range, and Kunlun. Nevertheless, a major trade route was established between Leh and Yarkand.

Ladakh is a high altitude desert as the Himalayas create a rain shadow, generally denying entry to monsoon clouds. The main source of water is the winter snowfall on the mountains. Recent flooding in the region (e.g., the 2010 floods) has been attributed to abnormal rain patterns and retreating glaciers, both of which have been found to be linked to global climate change. The Leh Nutrition Project, headed by Chewang Norphel, also known as the "Glacier Man", creates artificial glaciers as one solution for retreating glaciers.

The regions on the north flank of the Himalayas – Dras, the Suru valley and Zangskar – experience heavy snowfall and remain cut off from the rest of the region for several months in the year, as the whole region remains cut off by road from the rest of the country. Summers are short, though they are long enough to grow crops. The summer weather is dry and pleasant.

Zanskar is the main river of the region along with its tributaries. The Zanskar gets frozen during winter and the famous Chadar trek takes place on this magnificent frozen river.

Flora and fauna 

Vegetation is extremely sparse in Ladakh except along streambeds and wetlands, on high slopes, and irrigated places. About 1250 plant species, including crops, were reported from Ladakh. The first European to study the wildlife of this region was William Moorcroft in 1820, followed by Ferdinand Stoliczka, an Austrian-Czech palaeontologist, who carried out a massive expedition there in the 1870s. There are many lakes in Ladakh such as Kyago Tso.

The bharal or blue sheep is the most abundant mountain ungulate in the Ladakh region, although it is not found in some parts of Zangskar and Sham areas. The Asiatic ibex is a mountain goat that is distributed in the western part of Ladakh. It is the second most abundant mountain ungulate in the region with a population of about 6000 individuals. It is adapted to rugged areas where it easily climbs when threatened. The Ladakhi Urial is another unique mountain sheep that inhabits the mountains of Ladakh. The population is declining, however, and there are not more than 3000 individuals left in Ladakh. The urial is endemic to Ladakh, where it is distributed only along two major river valleys: the Indus and Shayok. The animal is often persecuted by farmers whose crops are allegedly damaged by it. Its population declined precipitously in the last century due to indiscriminate shooting by hunters along the Leh-Srinagar highway. There is only a small population of about 400 animals in Ladakh. The animal prefers open and rolling terrain as it runs, unlike wild goats that climb into steep cliffs, to escape from predators. The endangered Tibetan antelope, known as chiru in Indian English, or Ladakhi tsos, has traditionally been hunted for its wool (shahtoosh) which is a natural fibre of the finest quality and thus valued for its light weight and warmth and as a status symbol. The wool of chiru must be pulled out by hand, a process done after the animal is killed. The fibre is smuggled into Kashmir and woven into exquisite shawls by Kashmiri workers. Ladakh is also home to the Tibetan gazelle, which inhabits the vast rangelands in eastern Ladakh bordering Tibet.

The kiang, or Tibetan wild ass, is common in the grasslands of Changthang, numbering about 2,500 individuals. These animals are in conflict with the nomadic people of Changthang who hold the Kiang responsible for pasture degradation. There are about 200 snow leopards in Ladakh of an estimated 7,000 worldwide. The Hemis High Altitude National Park in central Ladakh is an especially good habitat for this predator as it has abundant prey populations. The Eurasian lynx, is another rare cat that preys on smaller herbivores in Ladakh. It is mostly found in Nubra, Changthang and Zangskar. The Pallas's cat, which looks somewhat like a house cat, is very rare in Ladakh and not much is known about the species. The Tibetan wolf, which sometimes preys on the livestock of the Ladakhis, is the most persecuted amongst the predators. There are also a few brown bears in the Suru Valley and the area around Dras. The Tibetan sand fox has been discovered in this region. Among smaller animals, marmots, hares, and several types of pika and vole are common.

Flora 
Scant precipitation makes Ladakh a high-altitude desert with extremely scarce vegetation over most of its area. Natural vegetation mainly occurs along water courses and on high altitude areas that receive more snow and cooler summer temperatures. Human settlements, however, are richly vegetated due to irrigation.
Natural vegetation commonly seen along watercourses includes seabuckthorn (Hippophae spp.), wild roses of pink or yellow varieties, tamarisk (Myricaria spp.), caraway, stinging nettles, mint, Physochlaina praealta, and various grasses.

Administration 

Under the terms of the Jammu and Kashmir Reorganisation Act, Ladakh is administered as a union territory without a legislative assembly or elected government. The head of government is a Lieutenant Governor appointed by the President of India who is assisted by civil servants of the Indian Administrative Service.

Districts 

Ladakh is divided into two districts:

Autonomous District Councils 
Each district of Ladakh is administered by an autonomous district council, they are:

Ladakh Autonomous Hill Development Council, Kargil
Ladakh Autonomous Hill Development Council, Leh

The two autonomous district councils work with village panchayats to take decisions on economic development, healthcare, education, land use, taxation, and local governance which are further reviewed at the block headquarters in the presence of the chief executive councillor and executive councillors. The government of Jammu and Kashmir looks after law and order, the judicial system, communications and the higher education in the region.

The two autonomous district councils continue to exist following the formation of the union territory of Ladakh on 31 October 2019.

Law enforcement and justice 
Ladakh is under the jurisdiction of the High Court of Jammu and Kashmir and Ladakh. The union territory of Ladakh has its own police force headed by a director general of police.

Ladakh in the Parliament of India 
Ladakh sends one member (MP) to the lower house of the Indian parliament the Lok Sabha. The MP for the Ladakh constituency in the current Lok Sabha is Jamyang Tsering Namgyal from the Bharatiya Janata Party (BJP).

Economy 

The land is irrigated by a system of channels which funnel water from the ice and snow of the mountains. The principal crops are barley and wheat. Rice was previously a luxury in the Ladakhi diet, but, subsidised by the government, has now become a cheap staple.

Naked barley (Ladakhi: nas, Urdu: grim) was traditionally a staple crop all over Ladakh. Growing times vary considerably with altitude.

A minority of Ladakhi people were also employed as merchants and caravan traders, facilitating trade in textiles, carpets, dyestuffs and narcotics between Punjab and Xinjiang. However, since the Chinese Government closed the borders between Tibet Autonomous Region and Ladakh, this international trade has completely dried up.

Indus river flowing in the Ladakh region is endowed with vast hydropower potential. Solar and wind power potentials are also substantial. Though the region is a remote hilly area without all-weather roads, the area is also rich in limestone deposits to manufacture cement from the locally available cheap electricity for various construction needs.

Since 1974, the Indian Government has encouraged a shift in trekking and other tourist activities from the troubled Kashmir region to the relatively unaffected areas of Ladakh. Although tourism employs only 4% of Ladakh's working population, it now accounts for 50% of the region's GNP.

This era is recorded in Arthur Neves The Tourist's Guide to Kashmir, Ladakh, and Skardo, first published in 1911.

Transportation 

The majority of roads in Ladakh are looked after by the Border Roads Organisation. There are two main roads that connect Ladakh with the rest of the country, NH1 connecting Srinagar to Kargil and Leh, and NH3 connecting Manali to Leh. A third road to Ladakh is the Nimmu–Padam–Darcha road, which is under construction.

There is an airport in Leh, Kushok Bakula Rimpochee Airport, from which there are daily flights to Delhi and weekly flights to Srinagar and Jammu. There are two airstrips at Daulat Beg Oldie and Fukche for military transport. The airport at Kargil, Kargil Airport, was intended for civilian flights but is currently used by the Indian Army. The airport is a political issue for the locals who argue that the airport should serve its original purpose, i.e., should open up for civilian flights. Since past few years the Indian Air Force has been operating AN-32 air courier service to transport the locals during the winter seasons to Jammu, Srinagar and Chandigarh. A private aeroplane company Air Mantra landed a 17-seater aircraft at the airport, in presence of dignitaries like the Chief Minister Omar Abdullah, marking the first ever landing by a civilian airline company at Kargil Airport.

Demographics 

The sex ratio for Leh district declined from 1011 females per 1000 males in 1951 to 805 in 2001, while for Kargil district it declined from 970 to 901. The urban sex ratio in both the districts is about 640. The adult sex ratio reflects large numbers of mostly male seasonal and migrant labourers and merchants. About 84% of Ladakh's population lives in villages. The average annual population growth rate from 1981 to 2001 was 2.75% in Leh District and 2.83% in Kargil district.

Religion

The Dras and Dha-Hanu regions are habitated by Brokpa, Drokpa, Dard and Shinu tribes and Shina people respectively, who are predominately followers of Islam while small minorities follow Tibetan Buddhism and Hinduism. The region's population is split roughly in half between the districts of Leh and Kargil. 76.87% population of Kargil is Muslim (mostly Shia), with a total population of 140,802, while that of Leh is 66.40% Buddhist, with a total population of 133,487, as per the 2011 census. Majority Ladakhis, Changpa and Brokpa follow Buddhism.

An increasing number of Muslim men and Ladakhi Buddhist women are marrying each other following a decline in the population of Buddhist men in Ladakh, leaving more Buddhist women without a spouse.

Language

The predominant mother-tongue in Leh district is Ladakhi (also called Bauti), a Tibetic language.  Purkhi, sometimes considered a dialect of Balti, is the predominant mother-tongue of Kargil district.  Educated Ladakhis usually know Hindi, Urdu and often English. Within Ladakh, there is a range of dialects, so that the language of the Chang-pa people may differ markedly from that of the Purig-pa in Kargil, or the Zangskaris, but they are all mutually comprehensible. Most Ladakhi people (especially the younger generations) speak fluently in English and in Hindi too, due to the languages education at school. Administrative work and education are carried out in English.

Culture 

Ladakhi culture is similar to Tibetan culture.

Cuisine 

Ladakhi food has much in common with Tibetan food, the most prominent foods being thukpa (noodle soup) and tsampa, known in Ladakhi as ngampe (roasted barley flour). Edible without cooking, tsampa makes useful trekking food. Strictly Ladakhi dishes include skyu and chutagi, both heavy and rich soup pasta dishes, skyu being made with root vegetables and meat, and chutagi with leafy greens and vegetables. As Ladakh moves toward a cash-based economy, foods from the plains of India are becoming more common. As in other parts of Central Asia, tea in Ladakh is traditionally made with strong green tea, butter, and salt. It is mixed in a large churn and known as gurgur cha, after the sound it makes when mixed. Sweet tea (cha ngarmo) is common now, made in the Indian style with milk and sugar. Most of the surplus barley that is produced is fermented into chang, an alcoholic beverage drunk especially on festive occasions.

Music and dance 

The music of Ladakhi Buddhist monastic festivals, like Tibetan music, often involves religious chanting in Tibetan as an integral part of the religion. These chants are complex, often recitations of sacred texts or in celebration of various festivals. Yang chanting, performed without metrical timing, is accompanied by resonant drums and low, sustained syllables. Religious mask dances are an important part of Ladakh's cultural life. Hemis monastery, a leading centre of the Drukpa tradition of Buddhism, holds an annual masked dance festival, as do all major Ladakhi monasteries. The dances typically narrate a story of the fight between good and evil, ending with the eventual victory of the former. Weaving is an important part of traditional life in eastern Ladakh. Both women and men weave, on different looms.

Sport 

The most popular sport in Ladakh is ice hockey, which is played only on natural ice generally mid-December through mid-February. Cricket is also very popular.

Archery is a traditional sport in Ladakh, and many villages hold archery festivals, which are as much about traditional dancing, drinking and gambling, as they are about the sport. The sport is conducted with strict etiquette, to the accompaniment of the music of surna and daman (shehnai and drum). Polo, the other traditional sport of Ladakh, is indigenous to Baltistan and Gilgit, and was probably introduced into Ladakh in the mid-17th century by King Singge Namgyal, whose mother was a Balti princess.

Polo, popular among the Baltis, is an annual affair in Drass region of Kargil district.

The Ladakh Marathon is a high-altitude marathon held in Leh every year since 2012.

Social status of women 

A feature of Ladakhi society that distinguishes it from the rest of the state is the high status and relative emancipation enjoyed by women compared to other rural parts of India. Fraternal polyandry and inheritance by primogeniture were common in Ladakh until the early 1940s when these were made illegal by the government of Jammu and Kashmir. However, the practice remained in existence into the 1990s especially among the elderly and the more isolated rural populations. Another custom is known as khang-bu, or 'little house', in which the elders of a family, as soon as the eldest son has sufficiently matured, retire from participation in affairs, yielding the headship of the family to him and taking only enough of the property for their own sustenance.

Traditional medicine 

Tibetan medicine has been the traditional health system of Ladakh for over a thousand years. This school of traditional healing contains elements of Ayurveda and Chinese medicine, combined with the philosophy and cosmology of Tibetan Buddhism. For centuries, the only medical system accessible to the people have been the amchi, traditional doctors following the Tibetan medical tradition. Amchi medicine remains a component of public health, especially in remote areas.

Programmes by the government, local and international organisations are working to develop and rejuvenate this traditional system of healing. Efforts are underway to preserve the intellectual property rights of amchi medicine for the people of Ladakh. The government has also been trying to promote the sea buckthorn in the form of juice and jam, as some claim it possess medicinal properties.

The National Research Institute for Sowa-Rigpa in Leh is an institute for research into traditional medicine and a hospital providing traditional treatments.

Education 
According to the 2001 census, the overall literacy rate in Leh District is 62% (72% for males and 50% for females), and in Kargil District 58% (74% for males and 41% for females). Traditionally there was little or nothing by way of formal education except in the monasteries. Usually, one son from every family was obliged to master the Tibetan script in order to read the holy books.

The Moravian Mission opened a school in Leh in October 1889, and the Wazir-i Wazarat (ex officio Joint Commissioner with a British officer) of Baltistan and Ladakh ordered that every family with more than one child should send one of them to school. This order met with great resistance from the local people who feared that the children would be forced to convert to Christianity. The school taught Tibetan, Urdu, English, Geography, Sciences, Nature study, Arithmetic, Geometry and Bible study. It is still in existence today. The first local school to provide western education was opened by a local Society called "Lamdon Social Welfare Society" in 1973. Later, with support from Dalai Lama and some international organisations, the school, now known as Lamdon Model Senior Secondary School, has grown to accommodate approximately two thousand pupils in several branches. It prides itself on preserving Ladakhi tradition and culture.

Schools are well distributed throughout Ladakh but 75% of them provide only primary education. 65% of children attend school, but absenteeism of both students and teachers remains high. In both districts the failure rate at school-leaving level (class X) had for many years been around 85%–95%, while of those managing to scrape through, barely half succeeded in qualifying for college entrance (class XII). Before 1993, students were taught in Urdu until they were 14, after which the medium of instruction shifted to English.

As of January 2022, there were 904 Government run schools in Ladakh and 113 publicly run private schools in Ladakh 

In 1994 the Students' Educational and Cultural Movement of Ladakh (SECMOL) launched Operation New Hope (ONH), a campaign to provide "culturally appropriate and locally relevant education" and make government schools more functional and effective.

The University of Ladakh with its two campuses (One each in Kargil & Leh) and its constituent colleges enables students to pursue higher education without having to leave Ladakh. A central University has also been approved to be set up in Ladakh by the Union Cabinet.  The Indian Astronomical Observatory is located in Hanle and is operated by the Indian Institute of Astrophysics.

In December 2019, the union minister of state for home affairs Mr G Kishan Reddy, in a written response has stated in Parliament that the Government of India has approved to establish a Medical College and National Research Institute for Sowa-Rigpa in the district of Leh.

In August 2021, the Parliament of India amended the Central Universities Act to establish a central university in Ladakh named "Sindhu Central University".

Media 

The government radio broadcaster All India Radio (AIR) and government television station Doordarshan have stations in Leh that broadcast local content for a few hours a day. Beyond that, Ladakhis produce feature films that are screened in auditoriums and community halls. They are often made on fairly modest budgets. On 14 December 2021, the first FM radio station in Ladakh was established in Leh.

There are a handful of private news outlets.

 Reach Ladakh Bulletin, a biweekly newspaper in English, is the only print media published by and for Ladakhis.
 Rangyul or Kargil Number is a newspaper published from Kashmir covering Ladakh in English and Urdu.
 Ladags Melong, an initiative of SECMOL, was published from 1992 to 2005 in English and Ladakhi.
 Sintic Magazine, a lifestyle and tourist magazine of Ladakh, was started in 2018 in English.

Some publications that cover Jammu and Kashmir as a whole provide some coverage of Ladakh.

 The Daily Excelsior claims to be "The largest circulated daily of Jammu and Kashmir".
 Epilogue, a monthly magazine covering Jammu and Kashmir.
 Kashmir Times, a daily newspaper covering Jammu and Kashmir.

Gallery

See also 

 Ladakh Buddhist Association
 Ladakh Scouts
 Ladakh Union Territory Front
 Emblem of Ladakh
 Polyandry in Tibet

Notes

References

Citations

Sources

Further reading 

 Allan, Nigel J. R. 1995 Karakorum Himalaya: Sourcebook for a Protected Area.  IUCN. 
 Cunningham, Alexander. 1854. Ladak: Physical, Statistical, and Historical; with notices of the surrounding countries. Reprint: Sagar Publications, New Delhi. 1977.
 Desideri, Ippolito (1932). An Account of Tibet: The Travels of Ippolito Desideri 1712–1727. Ippolito Desideri. Edited by Filippo De Filippi. Introduction by C. Wessels. Reproduced by Rupa & Co, New Delhi. 2005
 Drew, Federic. 1877. The Northern Barrier of India: a popular account of the Jammoo and Kashmir Territories with Illustrations. 1st edition: Edward Stanford, London. Reprint: Light & Life Publishers, Jammu. 1971.
 Francke, A. H. (1914), 1920, 1926. Antiquities of Indian Tibet. Vol. 1: Personal Narrative; Vol. 2: The Chronicles of Ladak and Minor Chronicles, texts and translations, with Notes and Maps. Reprint: 1972. S. Chand & Co., New Delhi. (Google Books)
 Gielen, U. P. 1998. "Gender roles in traditional Tibetan cultures". In L. L. Adler (Ed.), International handbook on gender roles (pp. 413–437). Westport, CT: Greenwood.
 Gillespie, A. (2007). Time, Self and the Other: The striving tourist in Ladakh, north India . In Livia Simao and Jaan Valsiner (eds) Otherness in question: Development of the self. Greenwich, CT: Information Age Publishing, Inc.
 Gillespie, A. (2007). In the other we trust: Buying souvenirs in Ladakh, north India . In Ivana Markova and Alex Gillespie (Eds.), Trust and distrust: Sociocultural perspectives. Greenwich, CT: Information Age Publishing, Inc.
 The Road to Lamaland by Martin Louis Alan Gompertz
 Magic Ladakh by Martin Louis Alan Gompertz
 Gordon, T. E. 1876. The Roof of the World: Being the Narrative of a Journey over the high plateau of Tibet to the Russian Frontier and the Oxus sources on Pamir. Edinburgh. Edmonston and Douglas. Reprint: Ch'eng Wen Publishing Company. Tapei. 1971.
 Ham, Peter Van. 2015.  Indian Tibet Tibetan India: The Cultural Legacy of the Western Himalayas. Niyogi Books. .
 Halkias, Georgios (2009) "Until the Feathers of the Winged Black Raven Turn White: Sources for the Tibet-Bashahr Treaty of 1679–1684", in Mountains, Monasteries and Mosques, ed. John Bray. Supplement to Rivista Orientali, pp. 59–79.Until the Feathers of the Winged Black Raven Turn White: Sources for the Tibet-Bashahr Treaty of 1679–1684 
 Halkias, Georgios (2010). The Muslim Queens of the Himalayas: Princess Exchange in Ladakh and Baltistan. In Islam-Tibet: Interactions along the Musk Routes, eds. Anna Akasoy et al. Ashgate Publications, 231–252. The Muslim Queens of the Himalayas: Princess Exchanges in Baltistan and Ladakh 
 Harvey, Andrew. 1983. A Journey in Ladakh. Houghton Mifflin Company, New York.
 Pandit, K. N. (1986). Ladakh, life & culture. Srinagar, Kashmir, India: Centre of Central Asian Studies, Kashmir University.
 Knight, E. F. 1893. Where Three Empires Meet: A Narrative of Recent Travel in: Kashmir, Western Tibet, Gilgit, and the adjoining countries. Longmans, Green, and Co., London. Reprint: Ch'eng Wen Publishing Company, Taipei. 1971.
 Knight, William, Henry. 1863. Diary of a Pedestrian in Cashmere and Thibet. Richard Bentley, London. Reprint 1998: Asian Educational Services, New Delhi.
 Moorcroft, William and Trebeck, George. 1841. Travels in the Himalayan Provinces of Hindustan and the Panjab; in Ladakh and Kashmir, in Peshawar, Kabul, Kunduz, and Bokhara ... from 1819 to 1825, Vol. II. Reprint: New Delhi, Sagar Publications, 1971.
 Norberg-Hodge, Helena. 2000. Ancient Futures: Learning from Ladakh. Rider Books, London.
 Peissel, Michel. 1984. The Ants' Gold: The Discovery of the Greek El Dorado in the Himalayas. Harvill Press, London.
 Rizvi, Janet. 1998. Ladakh, Crossroads of High Asia. Oxford University Press. 1st edition 1963. 2nd revised edition 1996. 3rd impression 2001. .
 Sen, Sohini. 2015. Ladakh: A Photo Travelogue. Niyogi Books. .
 Trekking in Zanskar & Ladakh: Nubra Valley, Tso Moriri & Pangong Lake, Step By step Details of Every Trek: a Most Authentic & Colourful Trekkers' guide with maps 2001–2002
 Zeisler, Bettina. (2010). "East of the Moon and West of the Sun? Approaches to a Land with Many Names, North of Ancient India and South of Khotan." In: The Tibet Journal, Special issue. Autumn 2009 vol XXXIV n. 3-Summer 2010 vol XXXV n. 2. "The Earth Ox Papers", edited by Roberto Vitali, pp. 371–463.

External links 

 Government of Ladakh official website

 
States and territories established in 2019
Union territories of India

History of the Republic of India
2019 establishments in India
Territorial disputes of Pakistan
Territorial disputes of China
Disputed territories in Asia
States and union territories of India